Thomas Guimarães Almeida (born 31 July 1991) is a Brazilian professional mixed martial artist, who currently competes in the Bantamweight division. A professional competitor since 2011, Almeida formerly competed for the Ultimate Fighting Championship (UFC) and Legacy FC, where he became the Legacy FC Bantamweight Champion, vacating the title shortly after signing with the UFC.

Mixed martial arts career

Early career
Almeida made his professional mixed martial arts debut in November 2011. He fought extensively in his native Brazil and amassed a record of 7–0 with four wins via KO before making his Legacy FC debut.

Almeida is managed by Wade Hampel of Big Fight Management.

Legacy Fighting Championship
Almeida made his Legacy Fighting Championship debut against Cody Williams on 16 November 2012, at Legacy FC 15. Almeida won the fight via KO in the first round.

Almeida faced George Pacurariu on 6 December 2013 at Legacy FC 26. Almeida won the fight via TKO in the first round.

Almeida was expected to face Aaron Philips on 20 June 2014, at Legacy FC 32 for the vacant Legacy FC Bantamweight Championship. However, Philips pulled out of the fight, and he was replaced by Caio Machado. Almeida won the fight via TKO in the first round to win the Legacy FC Bantamweight Championship.

Ultimate Fighting Championship
In June 2014, the UFC announced that they had signed Almeida to a multi-fight contract.

Almeida made his promotional debut against Tim Gorman on 8 November 2014 at UFC Fight Night 56. Almeida won the fight via unanimous decision, marking the first time ever he didn't finish an opponent in his pro career. The fight also earned him his first Fight of the Night bonus award.

Almeida faced Yves Jabouin on 25 April 2015 at UFC 186. He won the fight via TKO in the first round.  This win also secured Almedia his first Performance of the Night bonus award.

Almeida faced Brad Pickett on 11 July 2015 at UFC 189. Despite getting dropped twice in the first round, Almeida won the fight via knockout with a flying knee in the second round and also earned a Performance of the Night bonus.

Almeida faced Anthony Birchak on 7 November 2015 at UFC Fight Night 77. He won the fight via knockout in the first round. The win resulted in his third consecutive Performance of the Night bonus.

Almeida faced fellow undefeated prospect Cody Garbrandt on 29 May 2016 at UFC Fight Night 88. Despite being the betting favorite, Almeida had no answer for Garbrandt's hand speed and accuracy and lost the fight via knockout in the first round.

Almeida next faced Albert Morales on 19 November 2016 at UFC Fight Night 100. He won the fight via TKO in the second round and was awarded a Performance of the Night bonus.

Almeida faced Jimmie Rivera on 22 July 2017 at UFC on Fox 25. He lost the fight via unanimous decision.

Almedia next faced Rob Font on 20 January 2018 at UFC 220. He lost the fight via TKO in the second round.

Almeida was expected to face Marlon Vera on 2 March 2019 at UFC 235. However, Almeida pulled out of the fight on 31 January, citing an injury. It was later revealed that he was experiencing major issues with his vision and required eye surgery. In August 2019, Almeida announced that he hoped to return to action by end of 2019.

Almeida was expected to face Alejandro Pérez on  11 October 2020 at UFC Fight Night 179.  However, it was announced on 2 October that Pérez was forced out due to testing positive for COVID-19. He was replaced by Jonathan Martinez and the bout was moved a week later to UFC Fight Night: Ortega vs. The Korean Zombie.  Almeida lost the fight via unanimous decision.

Almeida faced Sean O'Malley on 27 March 2021 at UFC 260. After being knocked down in the first round, he eventually lost the fight via knockout in the third round.

After the loss, Almeida was announced to be no longer part of the UFC roster.

Championships and accomplishments
MMA Super Heroes
MMASH Bantamweight Championship (one time)
Legacy Fighting Championship
Legacy FC Bantamweight Championship (one time)
Ultimate Fighting Championship
Fight of the Night (one time) vs. Tim Gorman
Performance of the Night (four times) vs. Yves Jabouin, Brad Pickett, Anthony Birchak and Albert Morales
MMAJunkie.com
2014 November Fight of the Month vs. Tim Gorman
2015 July Knockout of the Month vs. Brad Pickett

Mixed martial arts record

|-
|Loss
|align=center|22–5
|Sean O'Malley
|KO (punch)
|UFC 260 
|
|align=center|3
|align=center|3:52
|Las Vegas, Nevada, United States
|  
|-
|Loss
|align=center|22–4
|Jonathan Martinez
|Decision (unanimous)
|UFC Fight Night: Ortega vs. The Korean Zombie
|
|align=center|3
|align=center|5:00
|Abu Dhabi, United Arab Emirates
|
|-
|Loss
|align=center|22–3
|Rob Font 
|TKO (head kick and punches)
|UFC 220 
|
|align=center|2
|align=center|2:24
|Boston, Massachusetts, United States
|
|-
|Loss
|align=center|22–2 
|Jimmie Rivera
|Decision (unanimous)
|UFC on Fox: Weidman vs. Gastelum 
|
|align=center|3
|align=center|5:00
|Uniondale, New York, United States
|
|-
|Win
|align=center|22–1 
|Albert Morales
| TKO (punches)
|UFC Fight Night: Bader vs. Nogueira 2
|
|align=center| 2
|align=center| 1:37
|São Paulo, Brazil
|
|-
|Loss
|align=center|21–1
|Cody Garbrandt
|KO (punches)
|UFC Fight Night: Almeida vs. Garbrandt
|
|align=center|1
|align=center|2:53
|Las Vegas, Nevada, United States
|
|-
|Win
|align=center|21–0
|Anthony Birchak
|KO (punch)
|UFC Fight Night: Belfort vs. Henderson 3
|
|align=center| 1
|align=center| 4:24
|São Paulo, Brazil
|
|-
|Win
|align=center|20–0
|Brad Pickett
|KO (flying knee)
|UFC 189 
|
|align=center|2
|align=center|0:29
|Las Vegas, Nevada, United States
|
|-
|Win
|align=center| 19–0
|Yves Jabouin
|TKO (punches)
|UFC 186
|
|align=center| 1
|align=center| 4:18
|Montreal, Quebec, Canada
|
|-
|Win
|align=center| 18–0
|Tim Gorman
|Decision (unanimous)
|UFC Fight Night: Shogun vs. Saint Preux
|
|align=center| 3
|align=center| 5:00
|Uberlândia, Brazil
|
|-
|Win
|align=center| 17–0
|Caio Machado
|TKO (body punch)
|Legacy FC 32
|
|align=center| 1
|align=center| 4:17
|Bossier City, Louisiana, United States
|
|-
|Win
|align=center| 16–0
|Vinicius Zani
|TKO (punches)
|MMA Super Heroes 3
|
|align=center| 4
|align=center| 3:52
|São Paulo, Brazil
|
|-
|Win
|align=center| 15–0
|George Pacurariu
|TKO (punches)
|Legacy FC 26
|
|align=center| 1
|align=center| 4:31
|San Antonio, Texas, United States
|
|-
|Win
|align=center| 14–0
|Cemir Silva
|TKO (punches)
|Standout Fighting Tournament
|
|align=center| 2
|align=center| 4:42
|São Paulo, Brazil
|
|-
|Win
|align=center| 13–0
|Willidy Viana
|TKO (punches)
|Alfenas Balada Fight 1
|
|align=center| 1
|align=center| 0:47
|São Paulo, Brazil
|
|-
|Win
|align=center| 12–0
|Valdines Silva
|KO (knee and punches)
|MMA Super Heroes 1
|
|align=center| 1
|align=center| 2:46
|Louveira, Brazil
|
|-
|Win
|align=center| 11–0
|José Alexandre
|TKO (punches)
|Bison FC 1
|
|align=center| 1
|align=center| 3:18
|São Paulo, Brazil
|
|-
|Win
|align=center| 10–0
|Gilmar Sales
|TKO (punches)
|Fair Fight: MMA Edition
|
|align=center| 1
|align=center| 2:32
|São Paulo, Brazil
|
|-
|Win
|align=center| 9–0
|Cody Williams
|KO (elbow)
|Legacy FC 15
|
|align=center| 1
|align=center| 2:28
|Houston, Texas, United States
|
|-
|Win
|align=center| 8–0
|Vander Correa
|KO (punch)
|Predador FC 22
|
|align=center| 1
|align=center| 2:21
|São José do Rio Preto, Brazil
|
|-
|Win
|align=center| 7–0
|Michel Igenho
|KO (punches)
|Predador FC 21
|
|align=center| 1
|align=center| 3:02
|Campo Grande, Brazil
|
|-
|Win
|align=center| 6–0
|Samuel Lima Brito
|Submission (guillotine choke)
|Gladiador Fight 3
|
|align=center| 1
|align=center| 1:32
|Araçatuba, Brazil
|
|-
|Win
|align=center| 5–0
|Ivonei Pridonik
|TKO (head kick and punches)
|Nitrix Champion Fight 11
|
|align=center| 1
|align=center| 1:21
|Joinville, Brazil
|
|-
|Win
|align=center| 4–0
|Edmilson Atanasio
|TKO (punches)
|Union Combat 1
|
|align=center| 1
|align=center| 1:57
|São Paulo, Brazil
|
|-
|Win
|align=center| 3–0
|Jorge Fernando
|Submission (armbar)
|Gold Fight Selection 3
|
|align=center| 1
|align=center| 0:47
|São Paulo, Brazil
|
|-
|Win
|align=center| 2–0
|Danilo Molina
|Submission (armbar)
|Thai Fight 3
|
|align=center| 1
|align=center| 2:16
|Taboão da Serra, Brazil
|
|-
|Win
|align=center| 1–0
|Jackson de Padua	
|Submission (rear-naked choke)
|Blessed Fight 4
|
|align=center| 1
|align=center| 4:03
||São Paulo, Brazil
|
|-

See also
 List of male mixed martial artists

References

External links
 
 

1991 births
Living people
Brazilian male mixed martial artists
Brazilian Muay Thai practitioners
Brazilian practitioners of Brazilian jiu-jitsu
Bantamweight mixed martial artists
Mixed martial artists utilizing Muay Thai
Mixed martial artists utilizing Brazilian jiu-jitsu
Ultimate Fighting Championship male fighters
Sportspeople from São Paulo